47 The American Sign Language and English Secondary School, is a public high school for the deaf in Kips Bay, Manhattan, New York City. Operated by the New York City Department of Education, it was previously known as "47" The American Sign Language and English Dual Language High School, Junior High School 47M, School for the Deaf, or Junior High School 47 (J.H.S. 47).

 it only serves high school students. Elementary and middle school grades are covered by the separate PS 347 The 47 American Sign Language & English Lower School. The two schools share a building.

In the 1940s it was the only public school catering specifically to the deaf in New York City. This remained true in 1998.

History
It was established in 1908 and was originally P.S. 47.

In 1998 the school was placed directly under the control of the NYC schools chancellor, and it was to begin teaching American sign language before teaching the English language. This made JHS 47 to be the first school in the United States to designate itself as an ASL language school. Despite its name at the time stating "junior high school", it actually served pre-kindergarten to the 10th grade. In 1998 the school announced it would serve up to grade 12, adding 25-40 students. By 1998 it served infants up to age 21. Martin Florsheim became the first deaf principal of the school.

In 2000 Florsheim attempted to move 35 teachers who were not having fluency in ASL out of his school and take in 35 who had ASL proficiency but the teacher's union opposed the move.

In 2002 its name changed to "47" The American Sign Language and English School. On February 1, 2005 Joel Klein, the chancellor of the school district, divided it into a K-8 and high school for budget reasons.

In 2010 the Department of Education proposed moving students from the Clinton School for Artists and Writers into the deaf schools building. This caused controversy over community members who feared this would disrupt the deaf environment.

Student body
In the 2020–2021 school year, the school had 234 students.

Instruction
The school uses ASL as its primary language. Previously the school had students use lip-reading, sign language, and whatever hearing abilities they had, which Jeff Archer of Education Week described as "an inconsistent mix". Florsheim stated that therefore, "There was no real clear-cut communication policy in our school" and that the school taught "a watered-down version of a general education curriculum". He stated that therefore the deaf students fell behind relative to hearing peers.

Student discipline
In 2007 the State of New York had categorized it as a "persistently dangerous school".

References

External links
 47 The American Sign Language and English Secondary School
 "47" Alumni Association of the Deaf, Inc.

Schools for the deaf in the United States
Public high schools in Manhattan
1908 establishments in New York City
Educational institutions established in 1908
Kips Bay, Manhattan